Geoglyph (Japanese: ジオグリフ, foaled 25 February 2019) is a Japanese Thoroughbred racehorse. He showed promise as a two-year-old in 2021 when he won two of his three races including the Sapporo Nisai Stakes. In the following year he ran second in the Tokinominoru Kinen before winning the Satsuki Sho.

Background
Geoglyph is a bay colt with a white star bred in Japan by Northern Farm. During his racing career he was trained by Tetsuya Kimura and raced in the black, red and yellow colours of the Northern Farm associate Sunday Racing.

He was from the first crop of foals sired by the American Champion Sprint Horse Drefong who was exported to Japan at the end of his track career. Geoglyph's dam Aromatico showed high class form in Japan, winning six of her twenty-seven races and being placed in both the Shuka Sho and the Queen Elizabeth II Cup. She was descended from the British broodmare Justitia, making her a distant relative of Roland Gardens and Kooyonga.

Racing career

2021: two-year-old season
Geoglyph began his racing career in a contest for previously unraced juveniles over 1800 metres on good to firm ground at Tokyo Racecourse on 26 June 2021. Ridden by Christophe Lemaire he started the 3.5/1 second favourite in a ten-runner field and won by one and a half lengths from Asahi with the favourite Ask Victor More a further half length away in third place. Lemaire was again in the saddle when the colt was stepped up in class to contest the Grade 3 Sapporo Nisai Stakes over the same distance on 4 September at Sapporo Racecourse. Starting the 1.1/1 favourite he raced towards the rear in early stages he moved up to take the lead in the straight and drew right away to win by four lengths from Ask Wild More. Lemaire later commented "he never hit top gear, so it was an easy win".

On 19 December at Hanshin Racecourse, Geoglyph was stepped up to Grade 1 class to contest Asahi Hai Futurity Stakes over 1600 metres and went off the 2.2/1 third choice in the betting behind Serifos. Lemaire positioned the colt towards the rear before making strong late progress but Geoglyph was never able to reach the leaders and came home fifth behind Do Deuce, beaten just under three lengths by the winner.

In the official Japanese rankings Geoglyph was rated the ninth-best two-year-old of 2021, six pounds behind the top-rated Do Deuce.

2022: three-year-old season
On his first run as a three-year-old, Geoglyph started favourite for the Grade 3 Tokinominoru Kinen over 1800 metres at Tokyo Racecourse on 13 February. He tracked the leaders for most of the way and made steady progress in the straight but was beaten a length and a half into second place by Danon Beluga. His trainer Tetsuya Kimura, later commented that the colt "hadn’t trained so well, which was possibly down to the climate and how he felt mentally."

In the Satsuki Sho over 2000 metres at Hanshin Racecourse on 17 April the colt started the 8.1/1 fifth choice in the betting behind Do Deuce, Danon Beluga, Equinox (Tokyo Sports Hai Nisai Stakes) and Killer Ability in an eighteen-runner field which also included Ask Victor More (Yayoi Sho), Onyankopon (Keisei Hai), Justin Rock (Kyoto Nisai Stakes), Be Astonished (Spring Stakes) and Matenro Leo (Kisaragi Sho). With Lemaire taking the ride on his more fancied stablemate Equinox, Geoglyph was partnered by Yuichi Fukunaga. Geoglyph tracked the leaders in fifth place as Ask Victor More set the pace, before switching to the outside to make his challenge in the straight. He ranged up alongside Equinox 200 metres from the finish and after briefly looking held by his stablemate he rallied strongly in the final strides to gain the advantage and win by a length. After the race Fukunaga said “His start was good and we were able to sit in an ideal position which was crucial in winning today... The colt has the strength to sustain his speed so I geared him wide launching an early bid before the fourth corner. I’m just glad I was able to do my job. In the Tokyo Yushun, we’ll have to see if he can handle the 400-meter added distance."

Geoglyph finished seventh at the Tokyo Yushun behind Do Deuce, and took a three month long break after undergoing a leg surgery to take out a chipped bone.

After recuperation, Geoglyph ran in the Tenno Sho (Fall) as well as the Hong Kong Cup came in ninth and sixth respectively.

Pedigree

References

2019 racehorse births
Racehorses bred in Japan
Racehorses trained in Japan
Thoroughbred family 19